John Richard Williams (29 September 1867 – 19 March 1924), often referred to as J. R. Tryfanwy or simply by his bardic name Tryfanwy, was a Welsh-language lyrical poet. He was born in the village of Rhostryfan in the old county of Caernarfonshire (Gwynedd), north Wales. He is buried at Portmadoc.

Welsh-language poets
Welsh poets
1867 births
1924 deaths